Roughnecks can refer to:
Roughneck, those employed in the oil industry.
Roughnecks (TV series), a 1990s BBC One programme about oil rig workers
Roughnecks: Starship Troopers Chronicles, a CGI animation television series
Calgary Roughnecks, a Canadian lacrosse team
Houston Roughnecks, an XFL (2020) team
Tulsa Roughnecks (1978–84), an American soccer team in the original North American Soccer League
Tulsa Roughnecks (1993–2000), an American soccer team in the United Soccer Leagues
Tulsa Roughnecks FC, an American soccer team in the United Soccer League set to begin play in 2015